KCAD (99.1 FM, "99.1 KCAD") is a radio station broadcasting a country music format serving western and central North Dakota, parts of northwest South Dakota and eastern Montana from Dickinson, North Dakota. The station is owned by iHeartMedia. KCAD signed on the air in 1996 and was the first FM country station in southwestern North Dakota.

External links
Roughrider Country 99.1

CAD
Country radio stations in the United States
Radio stations established in 1983
IHeartMedia radio stations